The 12.30 from Croydon (U.S. title: Wilful and Premeditated) is a detective novel by Freeman Wills Crofts first published in 1934. It is about a murder which is committed during a flight over the English Channel. The identity of the killer is revealed quite early in the book (making it an early example of the inverted detective story or "howcatchem"), and the reader can watch the preparations for the crime and how the murderer tries to cover up his tracks. The final chapters of the novel are set in a courtroom and during a private function at a hotel, where a résumé of the whole case is given in front of a small group of police detectives, solicitors, and barristers.

Plot summary

Set in Yorkshire and London in 1933, The 12.30 from Croydon is about 35-year-old Charles Swinburn, the owner of a factory in Cold Pickerby, Yorkshire, in which electric motors are produced. Swinburn has inherited the works from his father and uncle. While the former has been dead for many years, Andrew Crowther, his uncle, leads a retired life in the same town. At 65, his health has recently started to deteriorate. In particular, Crowther is suffering from indigestion.

Swinburn's business is hit by the Great Depression just like any other company, but when he asks his uncle for a loan to be able to avoid bankruptcy he is appalled to find that the old man, obviously no longer able to understand trends in the world economy, is unwilling to grant him a substantial sum to overcome his financial difficulties. Swinburn knows that he and his cousin Elsie will each inherit half of Crowther's fortune, so he does not see why he cannot have some of the money a bit earlier—"an advance on his legacy". At this point the first thoughts that it might be feasible to kill his uncle without being found out occur to Swinburn.

His unrequited love for a young woman called Una Mellor helps him come to a quick decision. "It seems a beastly thing to say", she tells him,

but I may as well tell you at once that under no circumstances would I marry a poor man. This is not entirely mercenary and selfish. I shouldn't be happy without the things I am accustomed to and my husband wouldn't be happy either. To marry where there would be shortage and privation would mean misery for both of us. It would be simply foolish and I'm not going to do it. [Chapter IV]

After thinking the matter over again and again, Swinburn resolves to poison his uncle with potassium cyanide. He takes all kinds of precautions when he buys the poison. Then he makes a pill that looks like one of Crowther's anti-indigestion tablets. He buys a bottle of those pills, buries the poisoned pill in that bottle, and, over dinner at his uncle's, spills a glass of wine which gives him the opportunity to exchange bottles without anyone noticing.

Charles Swinburn is particularly proud of his perfect alibi. On the following morning he books a three-week cruise of the Mediterranean. When he is informed of his uncle's death, he is in Naples, Italy. To his surprise, his uncle took the pill not at home but on his first (and last) flight, the 12.30 from Croydon: The family had been alarmed by a report stating that Elsie had had an accident in France, and Crowther had insisted on coming with Elsie's father and their daughter. On arrival in France he had been found dead.

  
An inquest is held, but Swinburn feels quite safe when no one seems to implicate him in the case. However, some time later he is approached by Weatherup, Crowther's butler, who claims he has seen him exchange the bottles, and who starts blackmailing him. Again, Swinburn sees no other solution than to "take that desperate remedy" and kill the butler. This time he cannot be as subtle as when planning his uncle's death. He brutally slays Weatherup with a piece of lead pipe and dumps his body in a nearby lake.

Soon afterwards he is arrested, tried, and hanged.

One of the interesting aspects of the novel is the insight the reader gains into the workings of a criminal mind. In particular, Swinburn's rationalization along utilitarian argumentative patterns must be mentioned in this context:

Then he told himself that all this morality business was only an old wives' tale. He, Charles, wasn't tied up by these out-of-date considerations! What was politic was right. What was the greatest good of the greatest number? Why, that Andrew should die. What about all the men that were going to be thrown out of employment? What about the clerks? What about poor old Gairns? What about Gairns's invalid wife? Andrew Crowther's useless life could count for nothing against such a weight of human suffering. [Chapter VII]

Crofts's Detective-Inspector Joseph French, who appears in several of his novels, keeps in the background during the action of The 12.30 from Croydon. He does solve the case, and explains how he did it in the final chapters of the novel, but the emphasis of the book is on the thoughts and deeds of the criminal.

Related works

Agatha Christie's Death in the Clouds (1935) is a whodunnit in which a murder is committed on a flight from Le Bourget to Croydon, with Poirot on board.
Francis Iles's Malice Aforethought (1931) is an earlier experiment in psychological suspense fiction.
Patricia Highsmith's This Sweet Sickness (1961) follows on his way to self-destruction a young murderer who is also driven by the prospect of gaining a beautiful lady in the end.
The protagonist of Simon Brett's A Shock to the System (1984) is also a killer who is deluded into thinking that he can get away with murder.

1934 British novels
Novels by Freeman Wills Crofts
Novels set in Yorkshire
Novels set in London
Fiction set in 1933
Hodder & Stoughton books
Novels set in hotels
Croydon Airport